The 2021 Rugby World Cup warm-up matches were a series of rugby union international test matches played to prepare teams for the 2021 Rugby World Cup, which were be held in New Zealand in October and November 2022. They involved the 12 teams qualified for the World Cup, with Spain also included. The 2022 Laurie O'Reilly Cup was contested as part of the fixtures. They were be held at a variety of venues from 24 July to 24 September 2022.

Matches

24 July 

Notes:
 Rumandi Potgieter and Monica Mazibukwana (South Africa) made their international debuts.

30 July

13 August

19 August

20 August 

Notes
 Dannah O'Brien, Aoife Dalton, Natasja Behan, Méabh Deely, Taryn Schultzer and Leah Tarpey (Ireland) made their international debuts.

Notes:
 Awhina Tangen-Wainohu and Tyla Nathan-Wong (New Zealand) and Bree-Anna Cheatham (Australia) made their international debuts.
 With this win New Zealand retained the Laurie O'Reilly Cup

27 August 

Notes:
 Grace Steinmetz and Santo Taumata (New Zealand) and Siokapesi Palu and Bienne Terita (Australia) made their international debuts

Notes:
 Jo Brown and Emma Tilly (Ireland) made their international debuts. 
 Brown had previously represented England, but switched international her allegiance to Ireland prior to this match

3 September 

Notes:
 With this win, England women equalled the record for the most consecutive wins by a test rugby team.

9 September

11 September 

Notes
 This match was cancelled as a result of the death of Queen Elizabeth II.

14 September

16 September 

Notes:
 Alowesi Nakoci was not named in the original matchday squad but went on to feature in the match.

23 September

24 September

References 

Warm-up